The American Society of Landscape Architects (ASLA) is a professional association for landscape architects in the United States. The ASLA's mission is to advance landscape architecture through advocacy, communication, education, and fellowship.

History

The ASLA was established on January 4, 1899, in New York City by a group of eleven founding members: President John Charles Olmsted, Nathan Franklin Barrett, Beatrix Farrand, Daniel W. Langton, Charles N. Lowrie, Warren H. Manning, Frederick Law Olmsted Jr., Samuel Parsons, George F. Pentecost Jr., Ossian Cole Simonds, and Downing Vaux. In 1960, the headquarters was moved to Washington, D.C.

The ASLA bestows various awards annually to professionals and students in the field of landscape architecture for designs and projects. Categories range in size, scale, and type from small residential areas to large parks and waterfronts. Their lifetime achievement award is called the American Society of Landscape Architects Medal.

Past presidents

References

External links
 Official site

Professional associations based in the United States
Organizations established in 1899
Architecture organizations based in the United States
Landscape architecture organizations
School accreditors
Non-profit organizations based in Washington, D.C.
501(c)(6) nonprofit organizations